is a city located in Fukuoka Prefecture, Japan.

The modern city of Ukiha was established on March 20, 2005, from the merger of the former town of  absorbing the town of Yoshii (both from Ukiha District).

As of April 30, 2017, the city has an estimated population of 30,431, and a population density of 260 persons per km². The total area is 117.55 km².

Transportation 
Train
Chikugo Yoshii, Ukiha, and Chikugo Ōishi stations are served by JR Kyūdai Main Line.

Notable people 
Hideo Murata - Rōkyoku and enka singer
Kenji Darvish - Drums of Golden Bomber, Japanese rock band.
Shinichi Ikejiri - writer and physician
Shinya Izumi - politician
Shuntaro Torigoe - journalist
Yasunoshin Shinohara - Inspector general and Jujutsu master of Shinsengumi

Related people
Ellison Onizuka - His grandfather and mother were born in this city, and he visited there in 1983. There is "Ellison Onizuka Bridge" commemorate him.

Sister city 
 Esashi, Hokkaido, Japan(since 31 October 2009) - It is associated with The Crab and the Monkey folktale

See also
 Groups of Traditional Buildings

References

External links

 Ukiha City official website 
 Ukiha page of Fukuoka Prefecture Tourism Association Website 

 
Cities in Fukuoka Prefecture